The Ragged Edge is a 1923 American silent South Seas romantic drama film produced by George Arliss with his Distinctive Pictures and distributed by Goldwyn and Cosmopolitan productions. It was directed by F. Harmon Weight and starred Alfred Lunt.

Cast

Preservation
With no prints of The Ragged Edge located in any film archives, it is a lost film.

References

External links

Still at silenthollywood.com

1923 films
1923 lost films
American silent feature films
Lost American films
Goldwyn Pictures films
Films based on American novels
1923 romantic drama films
American romantic drama films
American black-and-white films
Films set in Oceania
Films directed by F. Harmon Weight
1920s American films
Silent romantic drama films
Silent American drama films
1920s English-language films
English-language romantic drama films